William Bell Dinsmoor Sr. (July 29, 1886 – July 2, 1973) was an American architectural historian of classical Greece and a Columbia University professor of art and archaeology.

Biography
He was born on July 29, 1886, in Windham, New Hampshire.

Dinsmoor graduated from Harvard University with a Bachelor of Science degree (1906).  After working in an architectural firm, he joined the American School of Classical Studies in Athens, Greece in 1908 and became the School's architect in 1912.  Dinsmoor joined the faculty of Columbia University in 1919. In 1927–1928 he was the architectural consultant for the construction of the interior of a full-scale concrete replica of the Parthenon in Nashville, Tennessee.  He then returned to the American School as a professor of architecture (1924–1928). He was married to Zillah Frances Pierce (1886–1960).  During the years in Athens, he wrote his magnum opus, a rewritten edition of the Architecture of Ancient Greece by William James Anderson (1844–1900) and Richard Phené Spiers (1838–1916); it first appeared in 1927 and would go to three editions and be a mainstay for the teaching of Greek architecture through the twentieth century. In 1909, Dinsmoor visited Kardaki Temple in Corfu and subsequently published his findings in a brief paper. In 1934, following the resignation of S. Butler Murray, the Department of Fine Arts at Columbia was reorganized and Dinsmoor became chairman.  He held this position until 1955. During the mid-1930s, Dinsmoor took on a celebrated debate on the configuration of the three phases of the Parthenon with the eminent Acropolis scholar Wilhelm Dörpfeld.  In 1935 he was named professor of archaeology at Columbia University.  Between 1936 and 1946 he was president of the Archaeological Institute of America. During World War II, President Franklin Delano Roosevelt appointed Dinsmoor chair of  the Committee for the Protection of Cultural Treasures in War Areas.  For much of his career he taught at the American School of Classical Studies in Athens.  He retired from Columbia University in 1963.  In 1969 he was awarded the gold medal for his archaeological achievements by the Archaeological Institute of America. He died of a stroke while in Athens, Greece on July 2, 1973.

Legacy
Dinsmoor is best known for two major works.  The first of these is his complete rewriting of The Architecture of Ancient Greece (1927).  Dinsmoor's full bibliography is collected in the journal Hesperia. Although Dinsmoor always allowed much credit for the work to Anderson and Spiers, the revision of the book was essentially a unique accomplishment.  In 1931 Dinsmoor published his discovery about the archons from the Propylaia of the acropolis in Athens.  These lists of magistrates aided greatly the study of other objects from the Athenian Agora.  Dinsmoor determined the original design to the Propylaia. His son, William Bell Dinsmoor Jr., was also a distinguished classical architectural historian.

Bibliography
 Bibliography of William Bell Dinsmoor; Hesperia 35 (1966): 87–92.
 (1st Dinsmoor edition:) Anderson, William J., and Spiers, Richard Phené. The Architecture of Ancient Greece: an Account of its Historic Development, being the First Part of the Architecture of Greece and Rome. 2nd ed. New York: C. Scribner's,1927.
 The Architecture of Ancient Greece: an Account of its Historic Development. 3rd ed. New York: Batsford, 1950.
 Observations on the Hephaisteion. Baltimore: American School of Classical Studies at Athens, 1941.
 The Archons of Athens in the Hellenistic Age. Cambridge, MA: American School of Classical Studies at Athens, Harvard University Press, 1931.
 "An Archaeological Earthquake at Olympia". American Journal of Archaeology 45 (1941) 399–427.
 "Anchoring two floating temples [of the Agora, Athens]." Hesperia 51 (October/December 1982): 410–52.
 "The Burning of the Opisthodomos at Athens. I: The Date". American Journal of Archaeology 36 (1932): 143–172.
 "The Burning of the Opisthodomos at Athens. II: The Site".  American Journal of Archaeology 36 (1932): 307–326. [reply, Wilhelm Dörpfeld. "Der Brand des alten Athena-Tempels und seines Opisthodoms. American Journal of Archaeology 38 (April 1934): 249–57; reply, continued, Wilhelm Dörpfeld. "Parthenon I, II und III". American Journal of Archaeology 39 (October 1935):  497–507; [rejoinder by Dinsmoor] "The Older Parthenon, Additional Notes". American Journal of Archaeology 39 (October 1935):  508–9

Further reading
 Medwid, Linda M.  The Makers of Classical Archaeology:  A Reference Work.  New York:  Humanity Books, 2000 pp. 86–88.
 [obituaries:] “W. B. Dinsmoor, 87, an Archaeologist; Expert on Greece Is Dead--Long on Columbia Faculty.”  New York Times July 3, 1973, p. 26; Archaeology 26 (October 1973): 308.
 A History of the Faculty of Philosophy, Columbia University.  New York:  Columbia University Press, 1957, p. 54, 263–64.
 Nicgorski, Ann M. "Dinsmoor, William Bell." Encyclopedia of the History of Classical Archaeology.  Nancy Thomson de Grummond, ed.   Westport, CT:  Greenwood Press, 1996, vol. 1, pp. 363–64.

References

External links
 William Bell Dinsmoor papers, circa 1920-1950. Held by the Department of Drawings & Archives, Avery Architectural & Fine Arts Library, Columbia University.

1886 births
1973 deaths
Harvard University alumni
Columbia University faculty
20th-century American architects
American architectural historians
American male non-fiction writers
American School of Classical Studies at Athens
20th-century American historians
20th-century American archaeologists
20th-century American male writers
Corresponding Fellows of the British Academy
Presidents of the Archaeological Institute of America